Klyushnikovo is a rural locality (a village) in Novoselskoye Rural Settlement, Kovrovsky District, Vladimir Oblast, Russia. The population was 18 as of 2010.

Geography 
Klyushnikovo is located 29 km southwest of Kovrov (the district's administrative centre) by road. Anokhino is the nearest rural locality.

References 

Rural localities in Kovrovsky District